Paotai may refer to:

 Paotai, Guangdong (炮台镇), China
 Paotai, Liaoning (炮台镇), in Wafangdian, Liaoning, China
 Paotai Town, an  unincorporated town in Shawan County, Xinjiang Uyghur Autonomous Region, the seat of 121st Regiment  headquarters of the Xinjiang Production and Construction Corps.